American Sterling Bank was a bank based in Sugar Creek, Missouri. On April 17, 2009, the bank was shut down by the Federal Deposit Insurance Corporation as a result of a bank failure and its assets were sold to Metcalf Bank.

History
The bank was established in 1934 as Bank of Levasy.

In 1963, it was renamed Sugar Creek National Bank.

In 1983, it was renamed Sterling National Bank.

In 1998, it was renamed American Sterling Bank.

On Friday, April 17, 2009, the bank was shut down by the Federal Deposit Insurance Corporation as a result of a bank failure and its assets were sold to Metcalf Bank. The FDIC estimated the failure of American Sterling Bank would cost its deposit insurance fund $42 million.

In January 2010, the Federal Housing Administration began investigating loans made by the bank after loans from the bank incurred significantly high claims rates against the FHA’s mortgage insurance program.

In March 2010, the Office of Thrift Supervision issued an order against Michael Thompson, the former chief executive officer of the bank, and four of its board members prohibiting them from participating in the banking industry without prior regulatory approval. The agency found that Thompson “facilitated (American Sterling’s) recording of four fictitious capital contributions and its filing of inaccurate Thrift Financial Reports.”

References

Bank failures in the United States
Defunct banks of the United States
Defunct companies based in Missouri
Banks established in 1934
Banks disestablished in 2009
Banks based in Missouri
1934 establishments in Missouri
2009 disestablishments in Missouri